More is a gospel album by Mary Alessi which was recorded at the Covenant Church in Dallas, Texas and released on .

Track listing
"Pastor Mike Hayes introduction" (Mike Hayes) - 01:40
"Again I Say Rejoice" (Israel Houghton, Aaron Lindsey) - 04:32
"Praise the Lord" (Mary Alessi, Lindsey) - 04:53
"You've Made Me Glad" (Houghton, Lindsey, Cindy Cruse Ratcliff) - 04:36
"With My Whole Heart" (Alessi) - 04:35
"Filled With Your Spirit" (Alessi, Lindsey) - 04:21
"So We Lift" (Lindsey, Adrian Lindsey, Houghton) - 08:24
"More" (Alessi, Martha Munizzi) - 07:24
"I Worship You With All of Me" (Alessi, Munizzi) - 05:29
"Pray" (Alessi) - 05:33
"Another Breakthrough" (Houghton, Lindsey) - 04:24
"New Day Dawning" (Alessi) - 03:58
"Lord of the Breakthrough" (Houghton, Lindsey) - 05:36
"Pastor Mike Hayes Spoken Word" (Hayes) - 04:48
"In Him I Live" (Alessi, Lindsey, Houghton) - 04:57

Personnel
Aaron Lindsey - Piano, Keys, Programming & Vocals
Jerry Harris - Organ and pro Tools Editing
Christopher Coleman - Drums
Terrance Palmer - Bass
Israel Houghton - Electric & Acoustic Guitar, Lead Vocals on You've Made Me Glad"
Natural - Guitar on "You've Made Me Glad"
Phillip Lassiter - Horn Arrangements (Praise the Lord, Made Me Glad, In Him), Trumpet Solo (In Him)
Keith Jourdan - Trumpet
Freddie Morgan - Trumpet
Keith Anderson - Sax
Tom Lauer - Sax
Brad Herring - Trombone
Carl Murr - Trombone
Daniel Johnson - Vocals
Arthur Dyer - Vocals
Jamil Whiting - Vocals
Lacy Edly - Vocals
Stacey Joseph - Vocals
Joyce Halbert - Vocals
Stephanie Alessi - Vocals on "Pray"
Covenant Church Choir - Vocals

Certification and Chart Success
More peaked at #44 on Billboard magazine's Top Gospel Album.

References

Mary Alessi albums
2005 live albums